Claude Jorda (born 16 February 1938, in Bône, Algeria) is a French jurist and former Judge at the International Criminal Court (2003–2007). He resigned "for reasons of permanent ill-health". Previously, he had been a Judge at the International Criminal Tribunal for the former Yugoslavia (ICTY) since January 1994.

References

External links
Profile at ICC

1938 births
Living people
People from Annaba
20th-century French judges
21st-century French judges
International Criminal Tribunal for the former Yugoslavia judges
Presidents of the International Criminal Tribunal for the former Yugoslavia
International Criminal Court judges
French judges of United Nations courts and tribunals
French judges of international courts and tribunals